Mukhorshibir (Mukhar Sheber) is a rural locality (a selo) and the administrative center of Mukhorshibirsky District of the Republic of Buryatia, Russia. Population:

References

Notes

Sources

Rural localities in Mukhorshibirsky District